Manol Lazarov Sofiyanets (Bulgarian:Манол Лазаров Софиянец) born 1826 and died 1881, was a Bulgarian educationalist, poet and writer based in Sofia.

References

Георгиев, М. Софийският учител Манол Лазаров. – Софийски общински вестник, 1916, № 71.
А. И. (Ат. Иширков). Даскал Манол Лазаров. – В: Ловеч и ловчанско, кн. 3, С., 1931, с. 111
Динеков, П. Един софийски стихотворец (Манол Лазаров). – Сердика, 1941, № 2-3
Йонков, Х. Манол Лазаров. – В: Радетели за просвета и книжнина. С.: Народна просвета, 1986, с. 220-223.

1826 births
1881 deaths